The following are the qualification system and qualified countries for the Squash at the 2023 Pan American Games competition in Santiago, Chile.

Qualification system
A total of 50 squash athletes (25 men and 25 women) will qualify to compete. Each nation may enter a maximum of 6 athletes (three per gender), except for the NOCs that have qualified in Cali 2021. The host nation, Chile automatically qualified the maximum team size. Other seven men's and women's teams (of three athletes) will qualify through different qualification tournaments.

Qualification timeline

Qualification summary

Men

Women

References

P
Squash at the 2023 Pan American Games
Qualification for the 2023 Pan American Games